OK is a word expressing approval or assent.
OK or Ok may also refer to:
 OK (gesture)

Entertainment

Albums
 Okay (album), by As It Is, 2017
 OK (Chang Chen-yue album), 2007
 OK (The Fall of Troy album), 2016
 O.K. (Gabby's World album), 2015
 O.K. (Kool A.D. album), 2015
 OK (Talvin Singh album), 1998
 OK, by Gazzelle, 2021

Songs
 "OK" (Big Brovaz song), 2003
 "OK" (Farin Urlaub song), 2002
 "OK" (Robin Schulz song), featuring James Blunt, 2017
 "OK", by Backstreet Boys from DNA, 2019
 "Ok", by Beastie Boys from Hot Sauce Committee Part Two, 2011
 "OK", by Eels from Earth to Dora, 2020
 "OK", by Fujiya & Miyagi from Ventriloquizzing, 2011
 "Ok", by Helena Paparizou from Protereotita, 2004
 "OK", by Iyaz from Replay, 2010
 "OK!", by Jauz and San Holo, 2016
 "OK", by Madeon from Adventure, 2015
 "OK", by Meg from Beam, 2007
 "OK", by Nav from Bad Habits, 2019
 "OK!", by NCT from Universe, 2021
 "OK!", a Pokémon theme song
 "O.K.?", from the Rock Follies of '77 soundtrack, 1977
 "OK", by Wallows, 2020
 "OK (Anxiety Anthem)", by Mabel from High Expectations, 2019

Other entertainment
 Okay (band) or O.K., a 1980s German pop act
 Organized Konfusion or OK, a hip hop act
 o.k. (film), a 1970 West German anti-Vietnam War film by Michael Verhoeven
 OK!, a British celebrity tabloid
 OK! TV, a program affiliated with the magazine

Sports 
 OK (dinghy), a class of racing dinghy
 OK League, a defunct South African football league
 OK Liga, a Spanish men's rink hockey league
 OK Liga Femenina, a Spanish women's rink hockey league

Other
 Odnoklassniki (abbreviated to OK), a social network service used mainly in Russia
 Ok (Korean name), a family and given name, including a list of people with the name
 Ok (volcano), a shield volcano in Iceland
 OK cells, a cell line derived from North American opossum kidney
 O.K. Corral, site of the Gunfight at the O.K. Corral
 OK FM Legaspi (DWGB), a Filipino radio station
 OK FM Naga (DZOK), a Filipino radio station
 OK Kosher Certification, a food-products certification agency
 Ok languages, a family of languages spoken in New Guinea
 OK Motor Services, a defunct bus and coach operator in County Durham, England
 O.K. Range, a mountain range in British Columbia, Canada
 OK Sauce, a fruity brown sauce
 OK Soda, a soft drink
 OK-Supreme, a British motorcycle manufacturer
 Oklahoma, United States postal abbreviation
 Old Korean, the earliest attested stage of the Korean language
 Czech Airlines (IATA code)

See also 
 Okay (disambiguation)